Sanjiv Sidhu  who was born in June 1957, in Hyderabad, Indiais an Indian-American software entrepreneur known for founding i2 Technologies, a supply chain management software company, and o9 Solutions, a Dallas, Texas-based company which offers a decision management platform for multinational corporations.

Biography

Education 
In 1980, Sidhu graduated from Osmania University, Hyderabad, earning a bachelor of science degree in chemical engineering. He then moved to the United States and attended Oklahoma State University, earning a master of science degree in chemical engineering in 1982. Sidhu also did graduate work in systems and control engineering at Case Western Reserve University in Cleveland.

Career 
Sidhu founded and served as Chairman of i2 Technologies which specialized in supply chain management. i2 began in Sidhu's apartment in 1988 after he left his role as an engineer in the artificial intelligence lab at Texas Instruments where he was researching the feasibility and commercial applicability of a systematic approach to solving complex linear programming models. He was joined by Ken Sharma, formerly of the Goldratt Institute, with whom he worked at Texas Instruments. Their initial product was known as Factory Planner.

i2 Technologies went public in 1996, and at his peak Sidhu's personal stake in i2 hit a high of $6.5 billion; Forbes listed him as the 109th richest person in the world in 2001. At that point, he was considered the richest person of Indian origin in the world. In 2000, Sidhu was awarded the Non-Resident Indian of the Year by the Indian government.

References 
 What's the Big Idea?: Creating and Capitalizing on the Best Management Thinking By Thomas H. Davenport, Laurence Prusak, H.

External links 
 o9 Solutions - Official Website
 i2: Ahead of its time
 Version2 - Official Website

1957 births
American people of Indian descent
American businesspeople
Case Western Reserve University alumni
Indian emigrants to the United States
Oklahoma State University alumni
Businesspeople from Hyderabad, India
Living people
Texas Instruments people
American people of Punjabi descent